Magnus Ingesson, born February 18, 1971, in Luleå, Sweden, is a Swedish former cross-country skier who competed from 1993 to 2004. He earned a silver medal in the 4 × 10 km relay at the 2001 FIS Nordic World Ski Championships in Lahti, and had his best individual finish of ninth in the 15 km event at those same championships.

Ingesson's best individual finish at the Winter Olympics was eight in the 15 km event at Salt Lake City in 2002. His best individual career finish was second in four races up to 15 km from 1996 to 2000.

After retiring from competition in 2004, Ingesson became a police officer with the Swedish Police Authority, working as a detective in Piteå. From 2008 to 2010 he was co-head coach of the cross-country section of Ski Team Sweden together with Joakim Abrahamsson. He rejoined the Police Authority in 2010, while serving as the personal coach of Charlotte Kalla. He has been coaching Kalla full time since 2013, taking an unpaid leave of absence from the Police Authority, but receiving a salary through LKAB, one of Kalla's personal sponsors.

Since 12 April 2018, Ingesson once again is the coach for Team Sweden in women's cross-country skiing. In May 2018, it was announced he would share this leadership together with Annika Zell.

Cross-country skiing results
All results are sourced from the International Ski Federation (FIS).

Olympic Games

World Championships
 1 medal – (1 silver)

World Cup

Season standings

Team podiums
 2 victory – (1 ) 
 2 podiums – (1 , 1 )

References

External links
 

1971 births
Living people
People from Luleå
Cross-country skiers from Norrbotten County
Swedish male cross-country skiers
Cross-country skiers at the 2002 Winter Olympics
FIS Nordic World Ski Championships medalists in cross-country skiing
Piteå Elit skiers